The Australian Institute of Company Directors (AICD) is a non-profit membership organization for directors. The AICD is a founding member of the Global Network of Director Institutes (GNDI).

History 

The origins of the AICD can be traced back to the United Kingdom's Institute of Directors (IoD), formed by royal charter in 1906. Branches of the IoD appeared in the Australian states in the 1960s. These branches were amalgamated in January 1971 under the Institute of Directors in Australia, an autonomous body affiliated with the IoD in the United Kingdom. The challenge of servicing state branches saw the emergence of the Company Directors Association of Australia in 1982. The two bodies merged on 1 January 1990 to form the Australian Institute of Company Directors.

International associations 
AICD is a founding member of the Global Director Development Circle, now known as the Global Network of Directors Institutes. GNDI is composed of membership organizations for directors from Australia, the UK, US, Canada, Malaysia, New Zealand, Brazil and South Africa.

Structure 
AICD is a national organization with seven state and territory divisions and an international business unit. The board of directors consists of four national directors, seven divisional representatives and the MD and CEO. Angus Armor FAICD joined as managing director and chief executive officer in August 2017.

Membership 

There are six categories of membership:
Affiliate (AAICD)
Member (MAICD)
Graduate member (GAICD)
Fellow (FAICD) – List of Fellows of the Australian Institute of Company Directors
Life fellow (FAICD(Life))
International

Education 

AICD courses provide access to professional development opportunities for those interested in directorship and governance.

Advocacy 

The AICD advocates policies on issues of interest to directors and represent members on these issues. AICD engages with legislators, regulators and other stakeholder groups on issues affecting directors and boards. AICD engages with legislators, regulators and other stakeholder groups on issues affecting directors and boards.

Publications 

AICD produces a range of publications on corporate governance and directorship, including freely available resources to support governance in nonprofit organisations.

References

External links 
Australian Institute of Company Directors
Centre for Governance Excellence and Innovation
Small business directors and financial reporting

Corporate governance in Australia
Organizations established in 1990
1990 establishments in Australia
Professional associations based in Australia
Institute of Directors